Ameet Chana (born 12 September 1975 in Epsom, Surrey, England) is a British-Indian actor. His most notable role is Adi Ferreira in EastEnders.

In May 2006 he took over presenting the Breakdown Show (Bhangra Music) on BBC Asian Network (a National Radio Station).

He is married to barrister/actress Shikha Varma of 5 King's Bench Walk Chambers.

See also 

 List of British Sikhs

Filmography
Unhallowed Ground ... Jazz (2015)
Corner Shop Show ... Samad (2014)
Jab Tak Hai Jaan ... Amit (2012)
Casualty ... Police guard (2010)
YAA - Nachna (Music video) ... Guest dancer (2007)
Cash and Curry (2007)
Run, Fat Boy, Run (2007)
Jhoom Barabar Jhoom ... Shahriyar (2007)
It Could Be You (2005)
EastEnders ... Adi Ferreira (2003-2005)
Midnight Feast ... Shahab (2003)
Bend It Like Beckham ... Tony (2002)
Goodbye, Mr Steadman ... Police Officer (2001)
The League Of Gentlemen ... Shack (1999)
Wild West ... Gurdeep (1992)

References

External links
 

1975 births
Living people
English people of Indian descent
English male soap opera actors
English radio presenters
English male actors of South Asian descent
BBC Asian Network presenters
British male actors of Indian descent